The European Day of Jewish Culture is an event celebrated in several countries in Europe. The aim of this day is to organize activities related to Jewish culture and expose them to the public, with the intention that it would reveal the cultural and historical heritage of the Jewish people. The activities are coordinated by the European Association for the Preservation and Promotion of Jewish Culture (AEPJ), the European Council of Jewish Communities, B'nai B'rith Europe and the Network of Jewish Quarters in Spain. The aim of this day is to promote and raise awareness of Jewish culture to the wider society in the countries where this event takes place, in the belief that a greater awareness of the culture, tradition and life of the different communities living in the same country or city helps people to know the "other", and thus, strengthens communication and dialogue between cultures in the country.

History
The annual event was initiated in 1996 by the B'nai Brith of Strasbourg in the French département Bas-Rhin together with the local Agency for development of tourism. It now involves twenty-seven European countries including Turkey and Ukraine. The original aim of the day was to permit access to, and ultimately restore, long abandoned synagogues of architectural value like those of Wolfisheim, Westhoffen, Pfaffenhoffen, Struth, Diemeringen, Ingwiller or Mackenheim.
In 2000, a partnership was created between B'nai B'rith and the other organizations that currently participate in organizing the day's events.

Activities
On this day exhibitions, concerts, panel discussions, lectures and excursions are organized in many European countries. Topics such as Jewish neighborhoods, the coexistence of cultures, exhibitions on sculpture, painting, print, music and Jewish religious objects are discussed.

Celebration Days

 1999: September 5
 2000: September 6
 2001: September 6 - "Judaism and the Arts" 
 2002: September 6 - "Jewish Calendar and celebrations in Art, Music and Gastronomy"
 2003: September 6 - "Pesach"
 2004: September 6 - "Judaism and Education"
 2005: September 6 - "The Heritage of Jewish Cooking"
 2006: September 6 - "The European Routes of Jewish Heritage"
 2007: September 8 - "Testimonials"
 2008: September 4 - "Jewish Music"
 2009: September 6 - "Jewish Celebrations and Traditions"
 2010: September 5–15 - "Art in Judaism"
 2014: September 14 - "Women in Judaism"
 2015: September 6 - "Bridges"
 2016: September 4 - "Jewish languages"
 2017: September 3 - "Diaspora"

References

Jewish culture